The 1992 Japanese Grand Prix (formally the XVIII Fuji Television Japanese Grand Prix) was a Formula One motor race held at Suzuka on 25 October 1992. It was the fifteenth race of the 1992 Formula One World Championship.

The 53-lap race was won by Italian driver Riccardo Patrese, driving a Williams-Renault. It was Patrese's sixth and final Grand Prix victory, and the last win for an Italian driver for over a decade, until Giancarlo Fisichella won the 2003 Brazilian Grand Prix. Austrian Gerhard Berger finished second in a McLaren-Honda, with Englishman Martin Brundle third in a Benetton-Ford.

Pre-race
Two driver changes took place before the race: Ferrari replaced Ivan Capelli with their test driver Nicola Larini, while Karl Wendlinger left March to join Sauber's preparatory program ahead of the Swiss team's debut in 1993. His place was taken by Jan Lammers, making his first F1 start for over 10 years.

Qualifying

Qualifying report
Team-mate Riccardo Patrese was alongside him on the front row, while the McLarens of Senna and Gerhard Berger filled the second row. Michael Schumacher in the Benetton was fifth, followed by the two Lotuses of Johnny Herbert and Mika Häkkinen. The top ten was completed by Érik Comas in the Ligier, Andrea de Cesaris in the Tyrrell and Thierry Boutsen in the second Ligier.

Qualifying classification

Race

Race report
Mansell made a fast start and at the end of the first lap led Patrese by three seconds. Senna held on to third before becoming the race's first retirement on lap 3 with an engine failure. Meanwhile, Larini, who had qualified 11th, stalled on the grid and fell to last, while Boutsen's gearbox failed on lap 4. Olivier Grouillard in the second Tyrrell spun off and crashed at Spoon curve on lap 7.

Berger made an early pit stop and rejoined the race in sixth place, behind Schumacher and the two Lotuses. On lap 13, Schumacher retired with gearbox failure, his only mechanical retirement of the year; Herbert's gearbox also failed two laps later. After the mid-race pit stops for tyres, Mansell retained a comfortable lead over Patrese, while Berger moved ahead of Häkkinen into third and Martin Brundle, who had only qualified 13th in the second Benetton, moved up to fifth ahead of Comas and de Cesaris. Maurício Gugelmin in the second Jordan had also spun off the track and crashed at 130R leaving debris on the track by lap 23.

On lap 36, Mansell slowed and Patrese moved ahead. The following lap, Comas retired with an engine failure. The two Venturi Larousse cars collided at the chicanes as they were both on lap 40 at the time as Bertrand Gachot hit his Japanese teammate Ukyo Katayama and went off into the gravel trap, who managed to carry on and pit in for fresh tyres (despite making contact). On lap 45, both Mansell and Häkkinen suffered engine failures of their own; this moved Berger and Brundle into second and third respectively. Patrese cruised to his sixth and final Grand Prix victory, finishing 13 seconds ahead of Berger with Brundle a further minute back; the top six was completed by de Cesaris, Jean Alesi in the second Ferrari and Christian Fittipaldi, who scored his first point in Formula One and the only point of the season for the Minardi team.

Race classification

Championship standings after the race
Bold text indicates the World Champions.

Drivers' Championship standings

Constructors' Championship standings

References

Japanese Grand Prix
Japanese Grand Prix
Grand Prix
Japanese Grand Prix